In Aztec mythology, Tlazolteotl (or ,) is a deity of sexuality, vice, purification, steam baths, lust, filth, and a patroness of adulterers.

 is the deity for the 13th  of the sacred 260-day calendar Tōnalpōhualli, the one beginning with the day , or First Movement. She is associated with the day sign of the jaguar.

Tlazolteotl played an important role in the confession of wrongdoing through her priests.

Aztec religion
Tlazolteotl may have originally been a Huaxtec deity from the Gulf Coast who would have been assimilated into the Aztec pantheon.

Quadripartite deities

Sin

Encouragement of sin
According to Aztec belief, it was Tlazolteotl who inspired vicious desires and who likewise forgave and cleaned away sin. She was also thought to cause disease, especially STDs. It was said that Tlazolteotl and her companions would afflict people with disease if they indulged themselves in forbidden love. The uncleanliness was considered both on a physical and moral level and could be cured by steam bath, a rite of purification, or calling upon the Tlazōltēteoh, the deities of love and desires.

Purification
For the Aztecs there were two main deities thought to preside over purification: Tezcatlipoca, because he was thought to be invisible and omnipresent, therefore seeing everything; and Tlazolteotl, the deity of lechery and unlawful love. It is said that when a man confessed before Tlazolteotl everything was revealed. Purification with Tlazolteotl would be done through a priest. One could only receive the "mercy" once in their life which is why the practice was most common among the elderly.

The priest (tlapouhqui) would be consulted by the penitent and would consult the 260-day ritual calendar (tonalpohualli) to determine the best day and time for the purification to take place. On the day of, he would listen to the sins confessed and then render judgment and penance, ranging from fasts to presentation of offerings and ritual song and dance, depending on the nature and the severity of the sin.

Dirt eating
 was called "Deity of Dirt" and "Eater of Ordure" ('she who eats dirt [sin]') with her dual nature of deity of dirt and also of purification. Sins were symbolized by dirt. Her dirt-eating symbolized the ingestion of the sin and in doing so purified it. She was depicted with ochre-colored symbols of divine excrement around her mouth and nose. Through this process, she helped create harmony in communities.

Festival
The ceremonies conducted during this timeframe included ritual cleaning, sweeping, and repairing, as well as the casting of corn seed, dances, and military ceremonies.

In popular culture 
In the film Raiders of the Lost Ark, the fictitious artifact, the Golden Idol is based on the actual Aztec Dumbarton Oaks birthing figure. The artifact is presumed to depict Tlazolteotl.

Gallery

See also
 Xōchiquetzal
 Toilet god

Notes

References

External links
 

Aztec goddesses
Love and lust goddesses
Earth goddesses